Eagleville Bridge is a covered bridge located at Eagleville in the towns of Jackson and Salem, Washington County, New York.  The bridge, which crosses the Battenkill, is one of 29 historic covered bridges in New York State.

It was built by local builder Ephraim Clapp in 1858.

Town and Howe truss designs were patented by Ithiel Town in 1820 and William Howe (architect) in 1840, respectively.  The Eagleville Bridge employs "the patented Town lattice truss, consisting of top and bottom chords of laminated wood plank, and a web of diagonal wood planks connected by wood trunnels at each point of intersection".

It is one of four Washington County covered bridges submitted for listing in the National Register of Historic Places in one multiple property submission.  The others are the Buskirk Bridge, the Rexleigh Bridge, and Shushan Bridge.  All four were listed on the National Register of Historic Places on March 8, 1972.

The Eagleville bridge was damaged by a flood in 1977 but was "stabilized and returned to vehicular use".

References

External links

 Eagleville Bridge, at New York State Covered Bridge Society
 Eagleville Bridge, at Covered Bridges of the Northeast USA

Covered bridges on the National Register of Historic Places in New York (state)
Bridges completed in 1858
Wooden bridges in New York (state)
Tourist attractions in Washington County, New York
Bridges in Washington County, New York
National Register of Historic Places in Washington County, New York
Road bridges on the National Register of Historic Places in New York (state)
Lattice truss bridges in the United States